Isthmohyla insolita is a species of frogs in the family Hylidae.

It is endemic to Honduras.
Its natural habitats are subtropical or tropical moist montane forests and rivers.
It is threatened by habitat loss.

References

Isthmohyla
Endemic fauna of Honduras
Amphibians of Honduras
Frogs of North America
Critically endangered fauna of North America
Amphibians described in 1993
Taxonomy articles created by Polbot